"Going, going, gone!" is a phrase commonly used to close bidding in an auction chant.

Going, Going, Gone may also refer to:

 Going, Going, Gone (novel), a 2000 novel by Jack Womack

Film and television
 Going, Going, Gone (TV series), a 1990s BBC television series
 "Going Going Gone" (CSI: Miami), a 2006 episode of the American series CSI: Miami
 "Going, Going, Gone" (Grey's Anatomy), a 2012 episode of the American medical drama Grey's Anatomy
 "Going, Going, Gone", a 1979 episode of the American series Wonder Woman
 Going! Going! Gone!, a 1919 short comedy film

Music
 "Going, Going, Gone" (Bob Dylan song), 1974
 "Going, Going, Gone" (Lee Greenwood song), 1984
 "Going, Going, Gone" (Maddie Poppe song), 2018
 "Going, Going, Gone" (Bryan White song), 1994, also recorded by Neal McCoy
 "Going, Going, Gone" (Luke Combs song), 2022
 "Going Going Gone", a song by Tim Finn from his 2011 album The View Is Worth the Climb
 "Going Going Gone", a song by Dannii Minogue from her 2007 album Unleashed
 "Going, Going, Gone", a song by Information Society from the album Peace and Love, Inc.
 "Goin' Goin' Gone", a song by Thrasher Shiver from the album Thrasher Shiver
 "Going, Going, Gone", a song by Stars, featuring Emily Haines, from the album Nightsongs
 Going, Going, Gone, an album by Mild High Club

See also
 "Goin' Gone", a song by Kathy Mattea